The 1926 LFF Lyga was the 5th season of the LFF Lyga football competition in Lithuania.  Kovas Kaunas won the championship.

Kaunas Group

Klaipėda Group

North Division

South Division 
Winner: Sportverein Pagėgiai

Klaipėda Group Final
KSS Klaipėda 6-1 Sportverein Pagėgiai

Šiauliai Group

Final
Kovas Kaunas 2-0 LFLS Šiauliai
Kovas Kaunas 3-2 KSS Klaipėda

References
RSSSF

LFF Lyga seasons
Lith
Lith
1926 in Lithuanian football